William Eley, D.D. was an English priest and academic.

A graduate of Brasenose College, Oxford, he was the second President of St John's College, Oxford. He held the living at Crick, Northamptonshire and died in prison at Hereford in 1609.

References

Alumni of Brasenose College, Oxford
Presidents of St John's College, Oxford
16th-century English people
17th-century English people
1609 deaths